Oblique Strategies (subtitled Over One Hundred Worthwhile Dilemmas) is a card-based method for promoting creativity jointly created by musician/artist Brian Eno and multimedia artist Peter Schmidt, first published in 1975. Physically, it takes the form of a deck of  printed cards in a black box. Each card offers a challenging constraint intended to help artists (particularly musicians) break creative blocks by encouraging lateral thinking.

Origin and history 
In 1970, Peter Schmidt created "The Thoughts Behind the Thoughts", a box containing 55 sentences letterpress printed onto disused prints that accumulated in his studio, which is still in Eno's possession. Eno, who had known Schmidt since the late 1960s, had been pursuing a similar project himself, which he had handwritten onto a number of bamboo cards and given the name "Oblique Strategies" in 1974. There was a significant overlap between the two projects, and so, in late 1974, Schmidt and Eno combined them into a single pack of cards and offered them for general sale. The set went through three limited edition printings before Schmidt suddenly died in early 1980, after which the card decks became rather rare and expensive. Sixteen years later software pioneer Peter Norton convinced Eno to let him create a fourth edition as Christmas gifts for his friends (not for sale, although they occasionally come up at auction). Eno's decision to revisit the cards and his collaboration with Norton in revising them is described in detail in his 1996 book A Year with Swollen Appendices. With public interest in the cards undiminished, in 2001 Eno once again produced a new set of Oblique Strategies cards. The number and content of the cards vary according to the edition. In May 2013 a limited edition of 500 boxes, in burgundy rather than black, was issued.

The story of Oblique Strategies, along with the content of all the cards, exhaustive history and commentary, is documented in a website widely acknowledged as the authoritative source and put together by musician and educator Gregory Alan Taylor.

The text of Schmidt's "The Thoughts Behind the Thoughts" was published by Mindmade Books in 2012.

Design and use 
Each card contains a gnomic suggestion, aphorism or remark which can be used to break a deadlock or dilemma situation. A few are specific to music composition; others are more general. For example:
 Use an old idea.
 State the problem in words as clearly as possible.
 Only one element of each kind.
 What would your closest friend do?
 What to increase? What to reduce?
 Are there sections? Consider transitions.
 Try faking it!
 Honour thy error as a hidden intention.
 Ask your body.
 Work at a different speed.

From the introduction to the 2001 edition:

Cultural impact 
References to Oblique Strategies exist in popular culture, notably in the film Slacker, in which a character offers passers-by cards from a deck. Strategies mentioned include "Honor thy error as a hidden intention", "Look closely at the most embarrassing details and amplify", "Not building a wall; making a brick", "Repetition is a form of change", and one which came to be seen as a summary of the film's ethos (though it was not part of the official set of Oblique Strategies), "Withdrawing in disgust is not the same thing as apathy." This line was quoted in the 1994 song "What's the Frequency, Kenneth?" by R.E.M., who also mentioned Oblique Strategies in their 1998 song "Diminished" from the album Up. The Oblique Strategies are also referenced in comic 1018, "Oblique Angles", of popular web comic Questionable Content.

Other musicians inspired by Oblique Strategies include the British band Coldplay, said to have used the cards when recording their 2008 Brian Eno-produced album Viva la Vida or Death and All His Friends and French band Phoenix, who used the cards when recording their 2009 album Wolfgang Amadeus Phoenix. German musician/composer Blixa Bargeld has a similar navigation system, called Dave. In response to their song "Brian Eno", from their album Congratulations, MGMT has said they had a deck of Oblique Strategies in the studio, but they "don't know if [they] used them correctly." The band Bauhaus have used the cards for the composition of their songs.

They were most famously used by Eno during the recording of David Bowie's Berlin triptych of albums (Low, "Heroes", Lodger). Stories suggest they were used during the recording of instrumentals on "Heroes" such as "Sense of Doubt" and were used more extensively on Lodger ("Fantastic Voyage", "Boys Keep Swinging", "Red Money"). They were used again on Bowie's 1995 album Outside, which Eno was involved with as a writer, producer and musician. Carlos Alomar, who worked with Eno and Bowie on all these albums, was a fan of using the cards, later saying "at the Center for Performing Arts at the Stevens Institute of Technology, where I teach, on the wall are Brian Eno’s Oblique Strategies cards. And when my students get a mental block, I immediately direct them to that wall."

The Oblique Strategies cards deck is featured in Italian comics artist Igort's work Japanese Notebooks: A Journey to the Empire of Signs (Chronicle Books, 2017; original Italian edition: Quaderni giapponesi. Un viaggio nell'impero dei segni, Cononino Press, 2015).

Editions and variations

See also 
 Aleatoric music
 
 I Ching
 Lateral thinking
 The Lookout (album), written in part with a similar process to Oblique Strategies
 Water Yam (artist's book)
 More Dark Than Shark
 Creativity techniques

References

Further reading

External links 
 Online version
 Brian Eno explains Oblique Strategies on Jarvis Cocker's BBC6 Radio show, November 8, 2010

Brian Eno
Creativity
1975 introductions